Egnatius is a monotypic genus of grasshoppers belonging to the family Acrididae. The only species is Egnatius apicalis.

References

Acrididae
Monotypic Orthoptera genera